Festival Voix d’Amériques (FVA) was an annual festival in Montreal that was held from 2002 to 2011, which was dedicated to oral literature, text performance and spoken word.  It was presented by Les Filles électriques.

Held in early February, the FVA brought together some one hundred French- and English-language artists, shifting from La Sala Rossa (4848 St-Laurent) to the Casa del Popolo (4873 St-Laurent) and back again.

In 2004, the  recognized the merit and vitality of the FVA by making it a finalist for its 20th Grand Prix, in the literature section.

2005 Artists
In 2005, the artists included:

 Chloé Sainte-Marie
 Tony Tremblay
 Les Abdigradationnistes
 Susie Arioli & Jordan Officer
 Charles Guilbert
 Pol Pelletier
 Lin Snelling
 Loco Locass
 Jacques Bertrand
 Patrice Desbiens
 Michel Garneau
 Stanley Péan
 Hélène Pedneault
 François Patenaude (des Zapartistes)
 ATSA
 Renée Robitaille
 Ève Lamont
 Lillian Allen (Toronto)
 Motion in Poetry (Toronto)
 Sheri-D Wilson (Calgary)
 Kaie Kellough
 Norman Nawrocki
 Ginette
 Ève Cournoyer
 Karen Young
 Thomas Hellman
 Fanfare Pourpour
 Bernard Falaise

See also
 Canadian Festival of Spoken Word

References

External links
 Festival Voix d’Amériques
 Les Filles électriques

Literary festivals in Quebec
Festivals in Montreal
Festivals established in 2002
Spoken word
2002 establishments in Quebec
Performing arts in Montreal